This is a list of the tallest domes in the world. The dome can be measured by various criteria. There are different types of domes. Many of the tallest domes have a lantern. Strictly speaking, the lantern is not part of the dome, but often the overall height of the domes includes the height of the lantern.

Priority is given to the internal height of the dome. The internal height is measured from the floor of the building to the highest point of the ceiling of the dome (for domes that have a lantern, this is the level of the oculus).

This is a dynamic list. Any dome that has a verified height can be added to this list.

List 

Height up to eye of the lower inner dome 
Height up to the upper dome ceiling (excl. lantern)

See also 

 List of largest domes
 List of Roman domes

References

Lists of buildings and structures
Domes
Religion-related lists
Church buildings with domes
Religious buildings and structures with domes
Domes